The Battle of Landshut took place on 21 April 1809 between the French, Württembergers (VIII Corps) and Bavarians (VII Corps) under Napoleon which numbered about 77,000 strong, and 36,000 Austrians under the General Johann von Hiller. The Austrians, though outnumbered, fought hard until Napoleon arrived, when the battle subsequently became a clear French victory.

Prelude
There were in fact two engagements at Landshut. The first occurred on 16 April when Hiller pushed a defending Bavarian division out of the town. Five days later, after the French victory at Abensberg, the left wing of the Austrian army (36,000 men) withdrew on Landshut (this force was once more led by Hiller). Napoleon believed that this was the main Austrian army and ordered Lannes to pursue the enemy. Lannes’s troops caught up with Hiller on the twenty-first. Hiller had decided to defend Landshut to allow his baggage train to withdraw. At Landshut the Isar river was spanned by two bridges with a small island in the center. Hiller had positioned cavalry outposts to the north of the town. His main force was deployed in Landshut and to the south on higher ground. Early in the morning Hiller was informed that a French force (57,000 men) had crossed the Isar upstream at Moosburg. Masséna led this force.

The battle
Hiller realized that he would be unable to hold his position for long, as Masséna was trying to block him from escaping. At this point his cavalry were forced back by Lannes’s troops and the Austrians were pushed back into Landshut. The French now quickly seized the northern bridge over the river, and the Austrians withdrew into the main part of the town to defend the southern bridge. The Austrians tried to set fire to this second bridge, but owing to the rainfall over the previous days, this was only partially successful. However the Austrians did manage to close the gates at the end of the bridge. The French were now faced with attacking across the smoldering bridge. Napoleon ordered his aide General Georges Mouton (later comte de Lobau) to assume command of the attacking grenadiers of the 17th Line. In the face of heavy Austrian fire from all sides, Mouton ordered his men to attack without firing their muskets. The grenadiers reached the gateway and broke it down, allowing Bavarian troops to quickly reinforce the breach.

The fighting now continued in the streets of Landshut itself. However the French had crossed a bridge immediately to the west of the town and were now entering Landshut from the south.

Consequences
Many of the defenders were captured, but Hiller was able to retreat with the bulk of his force toward Neumarkt am Wallersee. Landshut finally fell to the French just after noon. The Austrian force had suffered around 10,000 casualties as well as losing 30 cannon, but more importantly they had lost many caissons, a pontoon train, and thousands of supply wagons. The victorious French forces spent much of the afternoon ransacking these supplies.

The other part of the Austrian army was attacked at the Battle of Eckmühl.

Notes

References

External links
 

Conflicts in 1809
Battles of the War of the Fifth Coalition
Battles involving Austria
Battles involving France
Battles involving Bavaria
Battles involving Württemberg
1809 in Bavaria
1809 in Germany
Landshut
April 1809 events
Battles in Bavaria
Battles inscribed on the Arc de Triomphe
History of Altbayern